Taubatornis is an extinct genus of teratorn from the Late Oligocene to Early Miocene (Deseadan) Tremembé Formation, in the Taubaté Basin, São Paulo state, Brazil. The type species is T. campbelli. It is the oldest known member of the family, about 25 million years old. The presence of a member of this family with this age supports the hypothesis of a South American origin for the Teratornithidae.

References 

Teratornithidae
Oligocene animals of South America
Paleogene birds of South America
Oligocene birds
Deseadan
Paleogene Brazil
Fossils of Brazil
Fossil taxa described in 2002
Tupi–Guarani languages
Prehistoric bird genera